Flaming Nuts (FLAMING NUTS) is the seventh studio album by Korean rock band Crying Nut. There hides a Bonus Track only for CD. Music videos for "Give me the money", "Lego", " Five Minute Laundry" are on YouTube.When this album was released, Crying Nut sued CNBLUE for copyright infringement. And then CNBLUE countersued for defamation of character and  an injunction against Crying Nut's online criticisms. But the court rejected CNBLUE's assertion.

Track listing

Personnel 
 Park, Yoon-Sik  – vocal, guitar
 Lee, Sang-Myun  – guitar
 Han, kyung-Rok  – bass
 Lee, Sang-Hyuk  – drums
 Kim, In-Soo  – Keyboards

Additional personnel
 Gahng, Hae-Jin - Violin (The Pirate’s Path)
 Kim, Hyun-Jung - Featuring (Happy Go Lucky Guy)

References

External links

2013 albums
Korean-language albums